Charlotte Cooper may refer to:
 Charlotte Cooper (author) (born 1968), British author and LGBT activist
 Charlotte Cooper (tennis) (1870–1966), British tennis player
 Charlotte Cooper-Andrade, wife of Vernon Andrade
 Charlotte Cooper (born 1986), British musician in The Subways

nl:Charlotte Cooper